Bird is a debut solo single album by South Korean singer Namjoo. The single was released on September 7, 2020 by Play M. It is composed by Soyeon and Yummy Tone, and choreographed by Lia Kim of the 1Million Dance Studio, located in Seoul. The song is a trap genre song with an appropriate addition of oriental elements with autobiographical message that she will not hesitate to fly over everything she loves and dream.

After 9 years of debut, Namjoo is the third member of Apink to debut solo, after Eunji and Hayoung.

Background and release
On August 18, Play M agency announced that Apink's Namjoo would be making her solo debut with single "Bird" on September 7. With this, Namjoo made her solo debut in 9 years as the third runner among Apink members following Eunji and Hayoung. Namjoo revealed the concept of the album is based on the message phrase that says 'birds break out of their eggs' from the book Damien by Hermann Hesse. It contains the message that she wants to be born as a strong woman. Soyeon who suggested the title 'Bird' after hearing her concept.

As multiple Korean media outlets said that Namjoo's showed a depicting appearance of overcoming adversity and being reborn as a peacock. With this album, Namjoo showed a shift from Apink style of music and styling such as dark smokey make-up, intense red dress, short and sharp-cut hair, and black and white nail art, saying, "The difference between A Pink Kim Nam-joo and solo singer Kim Nam-joo is the color. If pure white is Apink Kim Nam-joo, black will be able to see the strong and confident solo singer Kim Nam-joo." On September 5, Namjoo went on V Live and talked about how her collaboration with Soyeon came. She revealed that she watched Queendom, and was amazed with Soyeon's producing skills and thought "I want to try working with her."

Namjoo explained why she didn't include the tracks for her album because she wanted to focus only on one song. "The fans are sad, but I hope they don't feel sorry for me because I chose it."

Packaging 
The album preview was revealed for pre-order from August 31, a week exactly from the official release. The package is hard case and consists of a photo book, a CD, eight photo cards, six postcards and three posters.

Music and composition
Bird contains the autobiographical message of Namjoo that she will fly without hesitation for everything she loves and dreams. The debut single was co-written and co-produced by (G)I-dle's Soyeon with Yummy Tone. It is a trap genre song with an appropriate addition of oriental elements, with addictive sound and bold lyrics.

Commercial performance

Single
"Bird" entered major music charts such as Melon, Genie, Bugs, Soribada right after the release of her first single album Bird at 6pm.

Track listing

Credits and personnel
Credits are adapted from Melon.

 Namjoo – primary vocals
 Soyeon of (G)I-dle – producing, songwriting, arranger,
 Big Sancho (Yummy Tone) – producing, arranger, keyboard
 Kim Young-hyun – guitar
 Jeon Jae-hee – background vocal
 Kim Min-hee  –  recording
 Kwon Yoo-jin   –  recording
 Jang Woo-young  –  recording
 Jeon Jeon  – digital editor
 Jongpil Gu  – mixing
 Kang Sun-young – mixing engineer
 Kwon Nam-woo  – mastering

Promotions
The first promotional teaser poster for the single was released on August 24. On August 28, the track information image of the first single album Bird was released. In the image, the phrase "I'm gonna be free like a bird" symbolizes the whole concept of the album. Starting from August 29 to September 1, the agency PlayM released three concept teasers; Restrained, Resist and Reborn. The following day, a 17-second pre-performance video which was choreographed by Lia Kim was released.

On September 7, Namjoo held a global fan showcase broadcast live online at 8pm KST through Naver V Live before the song's digital release, hosted by Apink's leader Park Cho-rong.

Music video
Prior to its release, the song was accompanied by a 35-second music video teaser released midnight KST on September 4, 2020.

On September 7, "Bird" was released along with its music video. Choreography for the song was created by Lia Kim, who was formerly Namjoo's teacher at a dance academy and now a chief choreographer of the 1Million Dance Studio.

Charts

Album

Song

Certifications and sales

References

External links

2020 albums
Korean-language albums
Single albums
Albums produced by Jeon So-yeon